Alexene Farol Follmuth, known by her pen name Olivie Blake, is an American author who primarily writes fantasy novels, and is best known for The Atlas Six, a New York Times best seller.

Personal life 
Prior to being a full time writer, Blake obtained a master's degree in Urban Planning and worked at a public defender's office while attending law school.

Blake was born in the Bay Area, and currently lives in Los Angeles with her husband, son, and dog.

Career 
Blake curated her pen name through a name generator originally to anonymously write fan fiction. She had self-published six novels prior to being picked up by a traditional publisher.

Blake's most notable work is her only series, The Atlas Series, a trilogy that follows six medeians who are invited to the Alexandrian Society, five of whom are promised initiation, at the cost of one's elimination.

In 2020, The Atlas Six was self-published via Kindle by Blake; however, was later republished by Tor Books in 2022 with revisions after going viral on TikTok, Instagram, and Twitter. Late 2021, Amazon Studios announced they will be collaborating with Brightstar Productions and Blake to produce the novel into a television series.

Tor Books also republished Blake's Alone With You in the Ether, and will be republishing One For My Enemy later in 2023.

Blake published her first YA novel, My Mechanical Romance, in 2022 via Holiday House, under her real name, Alexene Farol Follmuth. My Mechanical Romance revolves around women in STEM, and was inspired by her husband, who is a high school physics teacher.

Blake uses her pen name for adult literature and her real name for young adult literature.

Works

Series 
The Atlas Series

 The Atlas Six (2020)
 The Atlas Paradox (2022)
 The Atlas Complex (2024)

Stand-alones 

 Masters of Death (2018)
 Lovely Tangled Vices (2018)
 One For My Enemy (2019)
 La Petite Mort (2019)
 Alone With You in the Ether (2020)
 My Mechanical Romance (2022)

Collections 
The Answer You Are Looking For Is Yes (An Anthology)

 Pars Fortuna (2019)
 The Magician's Assistant (2020)
 Stone's Throw (2020)
 Love in the Time of Dystopia (2020)
 Grow Your Own Optimist (2020)
 Toxic (2021)

Fairytale Collections

 Fairytales of the Macabre (2017)
 Midsummer Night Dreams (2018)
 The Lovers Grim (2019)

Awards and achievements

References 

Wikipedia Student Program
Living people
American fantasy writers
1988 births